Nocardioides cavernae is a Gram-positive, rod-shaped and aerobic bacterium from the genus Nocardioides which has been isolated from soil from a karst cave from Xingye County, China.

References

External links
Type strain of Nocardioides cavernae at BacDive -  the Bacterial Diversity Metadatabase

 

cavernae
Bacteria described in 2017